Kiehl is a surname. Notable people with the surname include:

John Kiehl, founder of Kiehl's
Jeffrey Kiehl, American climate scientist
Marina Kiehl, German skier
Heinz Kiehl, German wrestler
Reinhardt Kiehl, German mathematician
Kent Kiehl
Jesse Kiehl
Kiehl Frazier
Cinta Laura Kiehl

See also
Keel (surname)